"The Heretic Anthem" (released as "Heretic Song" as a single) is a song by American heavy metal band Slipknot. The song was released as a promotional single from their second album Iowa. Revolver magazine praised the track and described that it "flirt[s] with full-on death metal in their extremity, both sonic and thematic."

Song meaning 
The song was written about record labels who initially showed no interest in signing a recording contract with the band. The lyrics, "I bleed for this and I bleed for you/ Still you look in my face like I'm somebody new/ TOY – nobody wants anything I've got/ Which is fine, because you're made of/ Everything – I'm – NOT", reflect this attitude.

Track listing
Promo single

UK promo single

EU promo single

Covers
 The American band Periphery covered the song in 2012 and released as a bonus track for the limited edition of Periphery II: This Time It's Personal.

 Punk band Spite covered the song and released it as a single in 2014

 Deathcore act Carnifex covered the song on their 2018 EP Bury Me in Blasphemy

Personnel

Slipknot
(#0) Sid Wilson – turntables
(#1) Joey Jordison – drums
(#2) Paul Gray – bass guitar
(#3) Chris Fehn – percussion instrument, backing vocals
(#4) Jim Root – guitar
(#5) Craig Jones – samples
(#6) Shawn Crahan – percussion instrument, backing vocals
(#7) Mick Thomson – guitar
(#8) Corey Taylor – vocals

Production
 Ross Robinson – producer
 Mike Fraser – engineering
 Andy Wallace – mixing
 Monte Conner – A&R
 Steve Sisco – assistant engineering
 George Marino – mastering
 Steve Richards – executive producer

References

2001 singles
Slipknot (band) songs
Songs written by Corey Taylor
Songs written by Joey Jordison
Songs written by Paul Gray (American musician)
2001 songs
Roadrunner Records singles
Songs written by Jim Root
Death metal songs